The Governor General's Award for French-language non-fiction is a Canadian literary award that annually recognizes one Canadian writer for a non-fiction book written in French. It is one of fourteen Governor General's Awards for Literary Merit, seven each for creators of English- and French-language books. The Governor General's Awards program is administered by the Canada Council for the Arts.

The program was created and inaugurated in 1937, for 1936 publications in two categories, conventionally called the 1936 awards. French-language works were first recognized by the 1959 Governor General's Awards.

Winners and nominees

1950s

1960s

1970s

1980s

1990s

2000s

2010s

2020s

References 

French
Awards established in 1959
1959 establishments in Canada
Non-fiction
Canadian non-fiction literary awards
French-language literary awards